Aminomethyl propanol is an organic compound with the formula H2NC(CH3)2CH2OH.  It is colorless liquid that is classified as an alkanolamine.  It is a useful buffer and a precursor to numerous other organic compounds.

Synthesis
Aminomethyl propanol can be produced by the hydrogenation of 2-aminoisobutyric acid or its esters.

Properties
Aminomethyl propanol is soluble in water and about the same density as water.

Uses
Aminomethyl propanol is used for the preparation of buffer solutions.  It is a component of the drugs ambuphylline and pamabrom.  It is also used in cosmetics.

It is a precursor to oxazolines via its reaction with acyl chlorides. Via sulfation of the alcohol, the compound is also a precursor to 2,2-dimethylaziridine.

It is used in the synthesis of Fepradinol & G-130. It is also used for Isobucaine, and Radafaxine.

References

Amines
Primary alcohols